The 2020–21 EFL League Two (referred to as the Sky Bet League Two for sponsorship reasons) was the 17th season of Football League Two under its current title and the 29th season under its current league division format.

Team changes

The following teams have changed divisions since the 2019–20 season.

Stadiums

Personnel and sponsoring

Managerial changes

League table

Play-offs

First leg
 

Second leg

Final

Results

Season statistics

Top scorers

Hat-tricks

Most assists

Awards 

EFL League Two Team of the season

Notes

References

 
EFL League Two seasons
1
2
Eng